"Falling Down" is the third track and single from Atreyu's fourth album Lead Sails Paper Anchor. Due to "Doomsday" only being released in the UK, it is known as their second US single. Unlike most of Atreyu's music, which features primarily a metalcore style, "Falling Down" features a style reminiscent of pop punk. The song was featured on the music video game, Guitar Hero On Tour: Modern Hits.

Chart performance
"Falling Down" was a huge radio hit for Atreyu, peaking at No. 3 on Billboard's Alternative Songs chart and No. 5 on Billboards Mainstream Rock Songs chart. To date, it remains their highest peaking song on the Alternative Songs chart and tied with "Becoming the Bull" for their highest peaking song on the Mainstream Rock Songs chart.

Footnotes

Atreyu (band) songs
Hollywood Records singles
2007 songs
Song recordings produced by John Feldmann